Else Koffka (22 June 1901 in Wronke – 18 February 1994 in Hannover) was a German lawyer and judge at the Federal Court in Berlin. She was one of the first women to do her doctorate at the Faculty of Law at the Humboldt University, again one of the first women who took a faculty assistant position at a university in Germany, becoming the first German lecturer in criminal law, who received a legal teaching assignment without previous habilitation.

References

1901 births
1994 deaths
People from Wronki
People from the Province of Posen
20th-century German lawyers